Willow Grove is a historic home located at Greensboro, Caroline County, Maryland, United States. It is one of the few Georgian-style houses in Caroline County that were constructed between 1780 and 1790. It is a two-story brick house covered with a thin coat of stucco, measuring 37 feet long and 34 feet deep. It was built by Matthew Driver, Jr., who with three other members from Caroline County ratified the United States Constitution at the State Convention in 1788.

Willow Grove was listed on the National Register of Historic Places in 1972.

References

External links
, including photo from 1968, at Maryland Historical Trust

Houses completed in the 18th century
Houses on the National Register of Historic Places in Maryland
Houses in Caroline County, Maryland
Georgian architecture in Maryland
National Register of Historic Places in Caroline County, Maryland